Ibla is a genus of barnacle. In 1848, Charles Darwin studied the genus and found species with hermaphrodites and tiny males. In this genus the number androdioecious species is uncertain because some authors use the words female and hermaphrodite interchangeably.

Species
Species in this genus include:

Ibla cumingi
Ibla quadrivalvis
Ibla atlantica
Ibla sibogae
Ibla pygmaea
Ibla idiotica
Ibla cuvieriana

References 

Leach, M.D. (1825). XXIII. A tabular view of the Genera composing the Class Cirripedes, with Descriptions of the Species of Otion, Cineras, and Clyptra. The Zoological journal. 2: 208-215. page(s): 209 cited in WoRMS http://www.marinespecies.org/aphia.php?p=taxdetails&id=205861 
WoRMS (2021). Ibla Leach, 1825. Accessed at: http://marinespecies.org/aphia.php?p=taxdetails&id=205861

Barnacles